The Holiday class was the first class of newbuilds for Carnival Cruise Line after their first newbuild, which was completed in 1982. The first ship in the class, the 46,052 gross-ton vessel Holiday, was completed in 1985. A second and slightly larger sister ship, Jubilee, was built in 1986 at 47,262 gross tons. The third and final ship, Celebration, was identical to Jubilee and completed in 1987.

Carnival retired Jubilee in 2004 and transferred the ship to P&O Cruises Australia where it became Pacific Sun. In late 2005, Carnival took Holiday out of service to aid the victims of Hurricane Katrina for one year. Holiday then returned to service in late 2006 to resume cruising. Celebration was retired from Carnival's fleet in April 2008 to be used for a new sister company Iberocruceros as Grand Celebration. Carnival Cruise Lines retired Holiday in November 2009 and she began operating for Iberocruceros as Grand Holiday in May 2010.

In July 2012, P&O sold Pacific Sun to Chinese interests as Henna. Iberocruceros announced that Grand Celebration would be transferred to Costa Cruises in November 2014 as Costa Celebration. Also, in the same month, Costa Cruises announced that it would absorb Ibero Cruises in its entirety by the end of the year. Grand Celebration would still be transferred to the main fleet of Costa as Costa Celebration, and Grand Holiday would either be transferred or sold off. Ibero's docking slots in Barcelona, Spain, would be devoted solely to Costa's newest ship, .

In November 2014 it was announced Grand Holiday would join Cruise & Maritime Voyages. In March 2015, after a refurbishment in Greece, she entered service as Magellan and operated a range of Northern Europe and worldwide itineraries sailing from London Tilbury, Newcastle upon Tyne and Dundee, United Kingdom. Also, in November 2014, it was announced Costa Celebration had been sold to an unnamed buyer. The vessel completed its last cruise for the Spanish company Iberocruceros and entered drydock in Marseille, France, to be rebranded under Costa livery. The buyer was announced as Bahamas Paradise Cruise Line. The ship has returned to its old name as Grand Celebration and since February 2015 began sailing out of the Port of Palm Beach in Riviera Beach, Florida for cruises to Freeport, Bahamas.

In November 2015, HNA shut down its cruise ship operation after three years of losing money, due to newer vessels being deployed to the region. Since Hennas last cruise with HNA, she was laid up and put for sale for 35 million USD. With there being no interested buyers, the ship arrived in Alang, India, under the name Hen to be broken up in April 2017.

In 2020, the COVID-19 pandemic had greatly affected the cruise industry as cruise lines worldwide were forced to suspend sailing operations. The continued economic losses from suspended operations have resulted in some of the cruise lines either filing for bankruptcy or selling some of their ships to shed operating costs and lower their mounting debt. This had caused the demise of the two remaining Holiday class vessels. In November 2020, Bahamas Paradise Cruise line sold Grand Celebration for scrap. The ship was renamed Grand. It arrived in Alang, India and was beached for scrapping on January 14, 2021. Soon after Grand Celebration was beached for scrapping, Seajets sold Magellan for scrap after acquiring it from Cruise & Maritime Voyages following their bankruptcy. Magellan was renamed Mages and was beached in Alang, India for scrapping on January 30, 2021.

Ships

References

External links

 Carnival Cruise Line

Cruise ship classes
Carnival Cruise Lines